Gadezai is an administrative subdivision (tehsil) and Union council of Buner District in the Khyber Pakhtunkhwa province of Pakistan.

Gadezai/Salarzai was formally established by the appointment of first Assistant Commissioner/ Subdivision Magistrate Syed Hammad Haider PMS on 29th July 2020. 

District Buner has six tehsils: Daggar, Chagharzai, Chamla, Khudu Khel, Gagra and Gadezai. Each tehsil comprises certain numbers of Union council. There are 27 union councils in Buner District.

See also 

 Buner District

References

External links
United Nations
Hajjinfo.org Uploads
 PBS paiman.jsi.com 

Buner District